Luka Deborah (born in 2003) is a professional South Sudanese female footballer who plays as a forward in the South Sudan Women's National League for Yei Joint Stars FC.

Career 
Deborah is currently playing as a Striker for Yei Joint Stars FC which is located in Yei South Sudan and playing in the South Sudan women's National football league.

She is one of the best female footballer who does not miss to score a goal in every match she plays that makes her always an unstoppable striker.

Club 
She currently plays for Yei Joint Stars FC.

References 

South Sudanese women's footballers
2003 births
Living people
Women's association footballers not categorized by position